Armenian-Palestinian relations refers to relations between Armenia and the State of Palestine. Armenia supports Palestinian statehood. Armenia is an observer state of the Arab League in which Palestine is a full member. The former President of Armenia Serzh Sargsyan has stated Armenia supports the Palestinian People's self determination in an interview with Al Mayadeen. President of Palestine Mahmoud Abbas has also stated that he supports the expanding of Armenia, and called Armenians a "great ally of Palestine".

Armenians in Palestine 

There are currently 4,500 Armenians living in Palestine. In 1948, the total Armenian population in the Holy Land was at 15,000. Many Armenians have migrated in recent decades due to conflict and economic struggle, with thousands repatriating to Soviet Armenia or migrating to other countries during the 1948 Arab Israeli War. The presence of Armenians in the Armenian Quarter of Jerusalem goes back to the 4th century AD with the Armenian Patriarchate of Jerusalem being established since 638 AD.

Trade 
Trade between Armenia and Palestine has risen in recent years. Exports from Palestine to Armenia include packaged medicaments and exports from Armenia to Palestine include fruit juice and chocolate.

Recent events 
In January 2020, President of Armenia Armen Sarkissian visited Bethlehem and met with Palestinian president Mahmoud Abbas.

In November 2021, the Armenian foreign minister Ararat Mirzoyan met with his Palestinian counterpart in Paris.

Notable people 
 Lina Abu Akleh - human rights advocate

See also 
 Armenia–Israel relations
 Foreign relations of Armenia
 Foreign relations of Palestine

References 

Armenia–State of Palestine relations
Palestine
Bilateral relations of the State of Palestine